Taronga Zoo ferry wharf is located on the northern side of Sydney Harbour serving Taronga Zoo.

Services
Taronga Zoo wharf is served by Sydney Ferries Taronga Zoo services operated by First Fleet and Emerald class ferries. It is also served by Captain Cook Cruises services to Darling Harbour.

Interchanges
Keolis Downer Northern Beaches operates one route to and from Taronga Zoo wharf:
238: to Balmoral Beach

References

External links

Taronga Zoo Wharf at Transport for New South Wales (Archived 13 June 2019)

Ferry wharves in Sydney